Lo Su Fui JP is a Malaysian Chinese politician from Tawau, Sabah, Malaysia and He is part of United Sabah Party (PBS) member. He won the Tawau, Sabah seat in the 2022 Malaysian general election with GRS Coalition ticket. He is also the Special Officer (Chinese community affairs) to the Chief Minister of Sabah, Hajiji Noor.

Election results

References

United Sabah Party politicians
People from Sabah
Malaysian politicians of Chinese descent
Members of the 15th Malaysian Parliament
Living people
Year of birth missing (living people)